Lower Kohistan District is a district in Hazara Division of Khyber Pakhtunkhwa province in Pakistan. The district headquarters of Lower Kohistan is Pattan.

Overview and history 
In 2014, the provincial government bifurcated the Kohistan District into Upper Kohistan and Lower Kohistan district. At that time, Lower Kohistan comprised two tehsils, Palas and Pattan. In 2017, the tehsil of Palas was made a separate district and named as Kolai-Palas, while on 31 May 2018, Ranovali Pinkhad previously part of Pattan tehsil was made separate tehsil.

Demographics 
At the time of the 2017 census the district had a population of 202,502, of which 108,765 were males and 93,737 females. The entire population was rural. 8 people in the district were from religious minorities.

83.77% of the population belongs to Dardic peoples speaking one of the many Kohistani languages as their first language. 15.63% were Pashto speakers.

Administrative Units 
Lower Kohistan comprises two Tehsils:

 Pattan
Ranolia Bankad (also spell as Ranola)

Provincial Assembly

See also 

Kohistan
Khyber Pakhtunkhwa
 Districts of Khyber Pakhtunkhwa

References

 
 
Districts of Khyber Pakhtunkhwa
Hindu Kush